Gerard Kemkers (born 8 March 1967) is a former speed skater from the Netherlands, who represented his native country at the 1988 Winter Olympics in Calgary, Canada. There he won the bronze medal in the 5000 metres.

Kemkers retired from international competition in 1990 and became a coach.

During the 2006 Winter Olympics in Turin, Italy, he coached Ireen Wüst to two medals: 3000 m gold and 1500 m bronze, and Sven Kramer to a silver medal on the 5000 m.

During the 2010 Winter Olympics in Vancouver he coached Sven Kramer to the gold medal at the 5000 m and Ireen Wüst to the gold medal on the 1500 m. During Kramer's 10 km race, Kemkers made a mistake and guided Kramer to the wrong lane. Kramer finished first, with a time of 12:54.50 (even though he skated an extra lap in the outer lane) but was disqualified for failing to change lanes. As a result, Lee Seung-hoon won gold with a new Olympic record, 12:58.55.  Kramer later said, "At the end of the day, it is my responsibility. I am the skater on the ice, I have to do it".

Records

Personal records

Source:

World records

Tournament overview

Source:

Medals won

Overview of championships won by speed skaters coached by Kemkers

Other achievements
 Netherlands sport coach of the year (2006 and 2013)

References

External links
 Gerard Kemkers at SpeedSkatingStats.com
 Photos of Gerard Kemkers
 

1967 births
Living people
Dutch male speed skaters
Olympic bronze medalists for the Netherlands
Olympic medalists in speed skating
Olympic speed skaters of the Netherlands
Speed skaters at the 1988 Winter Olympics
Sportspeople from Groningen (city)
World Allround Speed Skating Championships medalists
Medalists at the 1988 Winter Olympics
Dutch speed skating coaches
Dutch sports coaches